Calling All Corpses is the fourth studio album by American horror punk musician Wednesday 13. It was released on 11 October 2011. On Wednesday July 13, Wednesday released the track listing via Braveworlds.com The Album artwork was created by D.A Frizell who has worked with Artists such as Avenged Sevenfold and Sevendust. The CD was mastered by Tom Baker at Precision Mastering, who has worked with Artists such as Marilyn Manson, Nine Inch Nails, Rob Zombie and Ministry.

Track listing

Personnel
Wednesday 13 - lead vocals, rhythm guitar, keyboards
Roman Surman - lead guitar, background vocals
Jack Tankersley - guitar, background vocals
Troy Doebbler - bass, background vocals
Jason "Shakes" West - drums
Brent Clawson - additional background vocals

References

2011 albums
Wednesday 13 albums